Turning On is a collection of thirteen science fiction short stories by American writer  Damon Knight. The stories were originally published between 1951 and 1965 in Galaxy, Analog and other science fiction magazines.

An Ace paperback reprinting in 1967 omitted the story "The Handler". This story was also omitted in the 1966 reissue of the Doubleday hardback edition.

Contents
 "Semper Fi"
 "The Big Pat Boom"
 "Man in the Jar"
 "The Handler"
 "Mary"
 "Auto Da Fé"
 "To the Pure"
 "Eripmav"
 "Backward, O Time"
 "The Night of Lies"
 "Maid to Measure"
 "Collector's Item"
 "A Likely Story"
 "Don't Live in the Past"

External links 

1966 short story collections
Science fiction short story collections
Works by Damon Knight
Doubleday (publisher) books